James Fred Purnell (December 12, 1941 – November 4, 2003) was a National Football League linebacker who played nine seasons.

Chicago Bears players
Los Angeles Rams players
Wisconsin Badgers football players
1941 births
2003 deaths
Evanston Township High School alumni